Arhopaloscelis is a genus of longhorn beetles of the subfamily Lamiinae, containing the following species:

 Arhopaloscelis bifasciatus (Kraatz, 1879)
 Arhopaloscelis maculatus (Bates, 1877)

References

Desmiphorini